The 93rd Evacuation Hospital was a make-over of the 61st Surgical Hospital and operated through World War II, Vietnam, and the Gulf War.

Service in World War II
The 61st Surgical Hospital was a 100-bed field hospital. It was converted in 1942 to a 400-bed semi-mobile evacuation hospital with a staff of 40 doctors, 43 nurses, and 6 administrative officers and organized as the 93rd Evacuation Hospital (Motorized).

Timeline
1942–1943 – Training at Fort Meade, Maryland
April 1943 – Embarkation at Camp Shanks, Orangeberg, New York
April 15, 1943 – Depart for North Africa aboard USS Mariposa
April 23, 1943 – Arrival at Casablanca, Morocco
May 1943 – Relocated by train to Oran, Algeria at Camp Goat Hill
June 1943 – Tizi, Algeria
July 1943 – Palm Beach, Algiers, Algeria
July 13, 1943 – Gela, Sicily in Operation Husky
July 25, 1943 – Pretralia, Sicily
August 1943 – San Stephano, Sicily
September 15, 1943 – Paestum, Italy
October 2, 1943 – Montella, Italy
October 1943 – Avellino, Italy
October 24, 1943 – January 9, 1944 – Piano de Ciazzo, Italy
January 1944 – Naples, Italy
January 23, 1944 – Anzio, Italy as part of Operation Shingle
January 29, 1944 – Nattuna, Italy with the U.S. 95th Evacuation Hospital
April 17, 1944 – Caserta, Italy
Additional locations in Italy
August 9, 1944 – Naples, Italy and embark
August 15, 1944 – Operation Dragoon D-Day H-6 landing St Maxime, France
Additional locations in France
Ardennes, France - Battle of the Bulge
December 19, 1944 – Bischwiller, Germany
April, 1945 - Dachau Concentration Camp
May 8 - July 8, 1945 - Germany
December 12, 1945 - Camp Kilmer, New Jersey, Deactivated

Personnel
Colonel Currier, Commanding Officer
Major Thompson, Executive Officer
Major Franklin Weimar Fry, Chief of Medicine and Registrar
Chaplain McMillan
Lt. D'Imperio
Major Etter, Evacuation Officer
Joseph William Genelius, Medic, Technician Five
Jeanne A. Carter Wells, Nurse, First Lieutenant
Cleo A. Dupy, Corporal
Dr. Quinby DeHart Gurnee

Operations and Battles
Operation Husky
Operation Shingle
Operation Dragoon
Battle of the Bulge
Colmar Pocket

See also
List of former United States Army medical units

References

External links
93rd Evac History
Military.com Unit Pages
93rd Evacuation Hospital: Histories
SURGERY IN THE FIELD, 93RD EVACUATION HOSPITAL, ITALY

0093
Medical units and formations of the United States Army